Hüseynbəyli  (also, Huseynbəyli and Guseynbeyli) is a village and municipality in the Barda Rayon of Azerbaijan.  It has a population of 407.

References 

Populated places in Barda District